Madron Well and Madron Well Chapel is a scheduled Ancient Monument in the civil parish of Madron, Cornwall, UK.

Madron Well Chapel is the ruin of a 12th- or 14th-century chapel dedicated to St Madern and occupies the site of a much older Celtic structure. Madron Well is a spring 200 m to the west. Clouties, or offerings, can be seen on the path to the chapel, near the holy well.

Location
The Bolitho estate owns the monument.

History and description

The altar appears to date from the first half or middle of the 12th century as do the stone seats and chancel. There is no evidence for any part of the structure being older but the existing structure does suggest an early Christian foundation. The building was partially destroyed by Major Ceely, during the English Civil War. At the 1886 annual meeting of the Penzance Natural History and Antiquarian Society, concern was shown for the removal of stone from here, as well as Kenidjack Castle and Chûn Castle.

A stream flows through the building and until the 18th century the well and stream were the only source of water for Madron and Penzance. The stream's course dictates the unusual placing of the entrance which is on the north wall instead of the normal, west of centre.

The chapel was first scheduled on 30 November 1926; it is currently scheduled under the Ancient Monuments and Archaeological Areas Act 1979 and is considered to be of national importance.

It is a classic site for the nationally scarce Cornish moneywort (Sibthorpia europaea), first reported here in 1824.

Well

The nearby Madron Well, which is now concealed in shrubs and undergrowth, is an example of a Cornish Celtic sacred site and is a ground level natural spring. The well is said to have healing properties and a 17th-century written account tells how, before 1641, John Trelille, a poor cripple, was cured here when he bathed in the water, then slept on a grassy hillock. The hillock was remade every year and was called St Maderne's bed. An old May Day tradition, which was still being observed in 1879, was for many young folks (mainly girls) to head from Penzance before sunrise, to perform a ceremony, to learn the number of years they have to wait before they get married. Two grass stems or straw, each about an inch long were fastened together with a pin and dropped into the water. Any rising bubbles denote the number of years before they get married. The ceremony was no longer held on May Day, but on a Sunday, because the girls work during the week. A tradition at this site persists to this day whereby people attach pieces of rag (clouties) to the nearby bushes as a symbol of appeasement to the spirits within the well (see also Clootie well) – according to a contemporary report in The Cornishman newspaper that tradition was no longer carried out in 1879.

In 1882 there was a proposal to pipe water from the well to Madron Churchtown at a cost of £150, Mr T S Bolitho offered to contribute to the cost.

References

External links

 

12th-century religious buildings and structures
Churches in Cornwall
Holy wells in Cornwall
Penwith
Ruins in Cornwall
Scheduled monuments in Cornwall
Chapels in England
12th-century church buildings in England